The Bathurst Baronetcy, of Lechlade in the County of Gloucester and of Farrington in the County of Oxford, was a title in the Baronetage of England. It was created on 15 December 1643 for Edward Bathurst. He was a descendant of Thomas Bathurst (15th century), whose brother Edward Bathurst was the ancestor of the Earls Bathurst. The title became either extinct or dormant on the death of the seventh Baronet in circa 1780.

Bathurst baronets, of Lechlade and Farrington (1643)
Sir Edward Bathurst, 1st Baronet (1614–1674)
Lancelot Bathurst, 2nd Baronet (died 1671)
Sir Edward Bathurst, 3rd Baronet (–1677)
Sir Edward Bathurst, 4th Baronet ( – c. 1688)
Sir Edward Bathurst, 5th Baronet ( – c. 1690)
Sir Francis Bathurst, 6th Baronet ( – c. 1738)
Sir Laurence Bathurst, 7th Baronet (died c. 1780)

See also
Earl Bathurst
Viscount Bledisloe
Hervey-Bathurst baronets

References

Extinct baronetcies in the Baronetage of England
Bathurst family